John Sydney Swan (12 January 1874 – 18 April 1936) (sometimes seen as Sidney) was a New Zealand architect, the designer of houses and churches in Wellington, New Zealand. He was articled to Frederick de Jersey Clere and was at one time a partner with Clere. Buildings he designed include Erskine College and St Gerard's Church and Monastery, and various commercial buildings, houses and Wellington Harbour Board buildings.

He was born and died in Wellington, and built the house, The Moorings in Glenbervie Terrace, Thorndon in 1905. His younger brother Francis Herbert Swan (1885–1956) also lived in Glenbervie Terrace, and in 1915 they formed an architectural partnership; Swan and Swan; later Swan, Lawrence and Swan.

He was a yachtsman, and Commodore of the Royal Port Nicholson Yacht Club.

He married Gertrude Mary Holcroft in 1899, they had three sons and one daughter.

References  

Obituary in Evening Post, Wellington of 20 April 1936 
Obituary in New Zealand Herald, Auckland of 21 April 1936
Obituary in Auckland Star, Auckland of 22 April, 1936 
Erskine College Chapel, plan by John Swan 
Proposed Wellington Cathedral design

1874 births
1936 deaths
New Zealand architects
New Zealand male sailors (sport)
People from Wellington City
New Zealand ecclesiastical architects